Helophorus ís the only genus in the beetle family Helophoridae (traditionally included within Hydrophilidae as the subfamily Helophorinae) within the Hydrophiloidea. They are small insects, found mainly in the Holarctic region (150 occur in Palearctic and 41 species in North America), but two or three species also live in the Afrotropical region, Central America and one in the Indomalayan region (northern India).

Characteristics 
Length about 2–9 mm. Body elongate with outline more or less interrupted between pronotum and elytra. On pronotum they have granulate sculpture and unique pattern of 7 longitudinal grooves. Ventral surface is with fine microsculpture, pubescent. Larvae are with long 3 segmented urogomphi and simple (non lobate) 8th tergum. They have four-segmented legs and a 10 segmented abdomen (with the 10th segment being a bit reduced).

Ecology 
The majority of Helophorus species adults are aquatic live on the periphery of rivers and streams as well as stagnant bodies of water or pools, though a number are also terrestrial. Adults generally feed on decaying plant material, though some are known to feed on living plant tissue, with several species noted as pests of turnips. The larvae are terrestrial and are predominantly carnivores, though in some species are herviorous, and are pests of turnips, rutabaga, and wheat.

Systematics and evolution 
Helophoridae belong to the superfamily Hydrophiloidea, and may be the sister taxon of Hydrochidae, or a clade comprising Hydrochidae, Hydrophilidae and Spercheidae or Georissidae and Epimetopidae. Earlier systems included all of these families in the family Hydrophilidae. The genus is divided into many subgenera (Atracthelophorus, Cyphelophorus, Empleurus,  Eutrichelophorus, Gephelophorus, Helophorus, Orphelophorus, Rhopalohelophorus and Transithelophorus).
The oldest fossils of Helophorus are from the Late Jurassic of Asia, with the major clades of extant Helophorus likely diverging from each other during the Early Cretaceous.

There are about 180 living species, including:

Helophorus abeillei
Helophorus aequalis
Helophorus alternans
Helophorus alternatus
Helophorus angustatus
Helophorus angusticollis
Helophorus aquaticus
Helophorus arcticus
Helophorus artus
Helophorus arvernicus
Helophorus asturiensis
Helophorus auricollis
Helophorus barbarae
Helophorus bergrothi
Helophorus biltoni
Helophorus brevipalpis
Helophorus browni
Helophorus californicus
Helophorus carsoni
Helophorus chamberlaini
Helophorus columbianus
Helophorus croaticus
Helophorus cuspifer
Helophorus daedalus
Helophorus difficilis
Helophorus discrepans
Helophorus dixoni
Helophorus dorsalis
Helophorus eclectus
Helophorus faustianus
Helophorus fenderi
Helophorus flavipes
Helophorus fortis
Helophorus frater
Helophorus frosti
Helophorus fulgidicollis
Helophorus furius
Helophorus glacialis
Helophorus grandis
Helophorus granularis
Helophorus griseus
Helophorus guttulus
Helophorus hammondi
Helophorus hatchi
Helophorus hilaris
Helophorus hirsutiventris
Helophorus inflectus
Helophorus illustris
Helophorus jacutus
Helophorus kaszabianus
Helophorus kerimi
Helophorus khnzoryani
Helophorus kirgisicus
Helophorus korotyaevi
Helophorus kozlovi
Helophorus kryzanovskii
Helophorus lacustris
Helophorus lapponicus
Helophorus laticollis
Helophorus latipennis
Helophorus lecontei
Helophorus ledatus
Helophorus leechi
Helophorus leontis
Helophorus lewisi
Helophorus liguricus
Helophorus linearis
Helophorus linearoides
Helophorus lineatus
Helophorus longitarsis
Helophorus maculatus
Helophorus marginicollis
Helophorus mervensis
Helophorus micans
Helophorus minutus
Helophorus montenegrinus
Helophorus nanus
Helophorus niger
Helophorus nigricans
Helophorus nitiduloides
Helophorus nitidulus
Helophorus nubilus
Helophorus oblongus
Helophorus obscurus
Helophorus orchymonti
Helophorus oregonus
Helophorus orientalis
Helophorus pallidipennis
Helophorus pallidus
Helophorus parajacutus
Helophorus paraminutus
Helophorus paramontanus
Helophorus paraspelendidus
Helophorus pitcheri
Helophorus ponticus
Helophorus poppii
Helophorus porculus
Helophorus pumilio
Helophorus redtenbacheri
Helophorus rinki
Helophorus robertsi
Helophorus rufipes
Helophorus schoedli
Helophorus schuhi
Helophorus sempervarians
Helophorus sibiricus
Helophorus similes
Helophorus smetanai
Helophorus splendidus
Helophorus strandi
Helophorus strigifrons
Helophorus subarcuatus
Helophorus subcarinatus
Helophorus syriacus
Helophorus terminassianae
Helophorus tuberculatus
Helophorus tumidus
Helophorus uvarovi
Helophorus zagrosicus

References 

Hydrophiloidea
Staphyliniformia genera